This is a list of parliamentary by-elections in the United Kingdom held between 1832 and 1847, with the names of the previous incumbent and the victor in the by-election and their respective parties.  Where seats changed political party at the election, the result is highlighted: light blue for a Conservative (or Tory before 1835) gain, orange for a Whig gain and green for Irish Repeal gain.

Resignations

Where the cause of by-election is given as "resignation" or "seeks re-election", this indicates that the incumbent was appointed on his own request to an "office of profit under the Crown", either the Steward of the Chiltern Hundreds, the Steward of the Manor of Northstead, the Steward of the Manor of Hempholme, the Steward of the Manor of East Hendred or the Steward of the Manor of Poynings.  These appointments are made as a constitutional device for leaving the House of Commons, whose Members are not permitted to resign.

By-elections

References

 
 British Parliamentary Election Results 1832-1885, compiled and edited by F. W. S. Craig (Macmillan Press 1977)
 F. W. S. Craig, British Parliamentary Election Statistics 1832-1987
 F. W. S. Craig, Chronology of British Parliamentary By-elections 1833-1987
 

1832
19th century in the United Kingdom